Ibn Razīn al-Tujībī was a 13th-century Muslim-Andalucían scholar who wrote "one of only two cookbooks to survive" from that era.

Al-Tujībī was born in 1227 to a wealthy family of scholars living in Murcia. The Christian reconquest of Spain led many Muslim families to flee including Al-Tujībī's. In 1247 the family ended up in Béjaïa (now Algeria). By 1259 Al-Tujībī had relocated to Tunis.

While Al-Tujībī wrote many books, only his cookbook, Fiḍālat al-Khiwān fī Ṭayyibāt al-Ṭaʿām wa-l-Alwān (English: Best of Delectable Foods and Dishes from al-Andalus and al-Maghrib), survives. The cookbook was composed in Tunis around 1260.

The cookbook was composed of recipes from Al-Tujībī's Al-Andalus heritage, where dishes had Muslim, Christian and Jewish influences. Until 2018 it was thought that there was no complete copy of the book remaining, until an accidental discovery at the British Library. Bink Hallum (of the British Library) asked for the expertise of the food historian Nawal Nasrallah who realised the significance of the finding. Nasrallah has since translated a copy version of the book into English, which was published in 2021.

See also
Nawal Nasrallah

References

Further reading
Nasrallah N, Best of Delectable Foods and Dishes from al-Andalus and al-Maghrib: A Cookbook by Thirteenth-Century Andalusi Scholar Ibn Razīn al-Tujībī (1227–1293), 2021, 

1227 births
1293 deaths
13th-century writers from al-Andalus
People from Murcia
Cookbook writers of the medieval Islamic world